Oroplema plagifera is a moth of the family Uraniidae first described by Arthur Gardiner Butler in 1881. It is found on the Korean Peninsula and in Japan (Hokkaido, Honshu, Shikoku, Kyushu, Yakushima Island), eastern China, Russia (Sakhalin), Taiwan and northern India.

The wingspan is 15–18 mm for males and 17–21 mm for females. The forewings are white, sparsely suffused with grayish scales. The hindwings are white. They resemble bird droppings. There are two generations per year in Korea. Adults have a resting posture in which the forewings are rolled up and extended horizontally and the hindwings are folded along the sides of the abdomen.

The larvae feed on Viburnum dilatatum and Viburnum furcatum.

References

Moths described in 1881
Uraniidae
Moths of Japan